The 2017 Asian Artistic Gymnastics Championships was the 7th edition of the Asian Artistic Gymnastics Championships, and were held in Bangkok, Thailand from 18 May to 21 May 2017.

Medal summary

Men

Women

Medal table

Participating nations 
128 athletes from 20 nations competed.

 (9)
 (9)
 (2)
 (10)
 (1)
 (3)
 (10)
 (3)
 (8)
 (10)
 (10)
 (8)
 (2)
 (3)
 (7)
 (9)
 (9)
 (2)
 (3)
 (10)

References 

Asian Artistic Gymnastics Championships
Asian Gymnastics Championships
International gymnastics competitions hosted by Thailand
2017 in Thai sport